Julio Edgar Gaviria Arenas  (1 April 1945 – 30 March 2009) was a Colombian footballer.

Club career
Gaviria was the son of former goalkeeper Julio "Chonto" Gaviria. He played as a defender for several clubs in Colombia, including Millonarios and América de Cali, where he won championships in 1972 and 1979.

International career
Gaviria also made appearances for the Colombia national football team, and was selected to play at the South American Championship 1967.

Death
Gaviria died in Medellín on 30 March 2009.

Honors
 Colombian Championship: 1972, 1979

References

External links
 Profile at GolGolGol.net

1945 births
2009 deaths
Colombian footballers
Millonarios F.C. players
América de Cali footballers
Categoría Primera A players
Colombia international footballers
Association football defenders
Footballers from Medellín